Mykhailo Hnatovych Hrechyna (April 2, 1902 – June 21, 1979), a Soviet architect from Ukraine, recipient of the Ukrainian State Prize (1982).

Biography
Mykhailo Hrechyna was born in the village of Budyshche, Kiev Governorate (Russian Empire), today it's the village of Cherkasy Raion around the city of Cherkasy. In 1930 he graduated from the architect department of the Kiev Art Institute (today, National Academy of visual arts and architecture).

Works

Kiev
 Lobanovskyi Dynamo Stadium 1937 (co-author)
 reconstruction - 1956-58, 1978–79
 Olimpiysky National Sports Complex, 1937–41
 reconstruction - 1967, 1978
 Palace of Sports 1960
 Komsomolsky Residential Massif 1963
 Building of the Trade-Industrial Chamber 1964
 Hotel "Rus" 1965-79

Kaniv
 Hotel "Taras's Hill" 1961

Family
 Father of Vadym Hrechyna

Awards
State Prize of Ukraine in Science and Technology - 1983

References

External links
  Brief bio

1902 births
1979 deaths
People from Cherkasy Oblast
Architects from Kyiv
Soviet architects
20th-century Ukrainian architects
Laureates of the State Prize of Ukraine in Science and Technology